The Philippines is archipelagic country in Southeast Asia, located in the northwest Pacific Ocean. It consists of 7,641 islands. The country is known to be "the most exposed country in the world to tropical storms", with about twenty tropical cyclones entering the Philippine area of responsibility each year. In the Philippine languages, tropical cyclones are generally called bagyo.

Climatologically, in the Northwest Pacific basin, most tropical cyclones develop between May and October. However, the Philippines can experience a tropical cyclone anytime in the year, with the most storms during the months of June to September. This article includes any tropical cyclone of any intensity that affected the Philippines from 2000 onwards.

2000s

2000 
May 21, 2000: Tropical Depression Konsing passes by the Babuyan Group of Islands.
July 5–7, 2000: Typhoon Kai-tak (Edeng) meanders over the western coast of Luzon while bringing torrential rainfall and landslides. 160 people were killed and 150 were missing on Luzon as a result.
July 13, 2000: Tropical Depression Gloring passes over Central Luzon bringing heavy rainfall, but fortunately no damages or casualties were reported.
July 22–23, 2000: Tropical Depression Huaning affects Northern Luzon with moderate to heavy rainfall.
August 22, 2000: Typhoon Bilis (Isang) and its outer rain bands affect the extreme northern Luzon and Batanes with rainfall and gusty winds.
September 5, 2000: Tropical Storm Bopha (Ningning) mainly affects the Cagayan Valley and Isabela province.
October 27–29, 2000: Typhoon Xangsane (Reming) hits the Bicol Region, Southern Luzon and Metro Manila. In Tayabas, Quezon, rainfall of 312.3 mm was observed in 24 hours. The storm killed 40 people, lost 100,000 homes, and caused damage of $27.45 million.
November 1–2, 2000: Tropical Storm Bebinca (Seniang) made a direct hit over Metro Manila since 1992. The storm only resulted in 26 deaths.
November 30–December 1, 2000: Tropical Storm Rumbia (Toyang) makes landfall over Eastern Samar and traverses much of Visayas. Flash floods were seen throughout most of the country, especially in Visayas and Mindanao. Landslides took place in the provinces of Bohol and Leyte. Overall, its effects killed 48 people.
December 6–7, 2000: Tropical Depression Ulpiang flooded many regions in Visayas, causing landslides and killed 3 people.

2001 
February 18–19, 2001: Tropical Depression Auring brought rainfall throughout most of Visayas and Mindanao. Damages from crops and property have been estimated at ₱200 million (US$4.16 million).
May 10–13, 2001: Tropical Storm Cimaron (Crising) brings heavy rainfall throughout most of the country due to its slow movement.
June 21, 2001: Typhoon Chebi (Emong) affects Batanes and the Babuyan Group of Islands.
July 4, 2001: Tropical Storm Utor (Feria) brings torrential rainfall over Northern Luzon, with Baguio experiencing a new 24-hour rainfall record. 163 people have died from the storm.
July 10, 2001: Tropical Storm Trami (Gorio) affects the northern portion of Luzon bringing light rainfall.
July 28–29, 2001: Typhoon Toraji (Isang) brings heavy rainfall to much of Luzon from its outflow.
September 23–25, 2001: Typhoon Lekima (Labuyo) affects much of Northern Luzon and Batanes due to its slow movement, bringing heavy rainfall.
November 7–8, 2001: Typhoon Lingling (Nanang) traverses much of Visayas bringing torrential rainfall, causing flash flooding and several landslides. As a result, 171 people have died.
December 5–6, 2001: Tropical Storm Kajiki (Quedan) brought light to moderate rainfall over Visayas, killing two people and over 6,000 people displaced.

2002 
January 13–14, 2002: Tropical Storm Tapah (Agaton) nears the eastern coast of Luzon and made landfall over Isabela province.
March 21–22, 2002: Tropical Depression Caloy moved over Mindanao, Central Visayas and Palawan. The storm damaged 2,703 homes, including 215 that were destroyed. Damage totaled about $2.4 million (₱124 million PHP). 35 people died from the storm.
July 2–3, 2002: Typhoon Rammasun (Florita) enhances the southwest monsoon, which caused several landslides, leading to more than 3,000 people had to evacuate.
July 11–13, 2002: Similar to the previous storm, Tropical Storm Nakri (Hambalos) and Typhoon Halong (Inday) enhances the monsoon which brought extreme rainfall over much of the Philippines.
July 19–22, 2002: Tropical Depression Juan traverses Visayas and Luzon, dropping heavy rainfall.
August 12–13, 2002: Tropical Depression Milenyo passes the Bicol Region, Southern Luzon and Manila, killing 35 people and caused $3.3 million in damage, with 13,178 houses damaged or destroyed.

2003 
April 20–23, 2003: Typhoon Kujira (Amang) mostly affected Batanes and the Babuyan Group of Islands with Tropical Cyclone Signal No. 2 being raised there.

May 26–28, 2003: Tropical Storm Linfa (Chedeng) and its slow moment caused severe flooding and torrential rainfall to most of Luzon. 41 people died in total from the storm.
June 2, 2003: Tropical Storm Nangka (Dodong) passes the extreme Northern Luzon.
June 15–17, 2003: Typhoon Soudelor (Egay) affects the eastern portion of the country bringing moderate rainfall.
July 18–19, 2003: Tropical Storm Koni (Gilas) traverses Visayas bringing rainfall in the archipelago.
July 21–22, 2003: Typhoon Imbudo (Harurot) batters Luzon with torrential rainfall and gusty winds. Power outages were experienced in Manila and the capacity of the Magat Dam reached its limit. 64 people died, mostly from the Cagayan Province.
August 3, 2003: Tropical Storm Morakot (Juaning) closes Batanes bringing light rainfall. No deaths and damage were seen.
August 22, 2003: Typhoon Krovanh (Niña) impacts northern Luzon with heavy rainfall.
September 1, 2003: Typhoon Dujuan (Onyok) passes by the extreme northern islands of Luzon. Along with the southwest monsoon, flash flooding in Metro Manila covered roads, causing traffic jams. Dangerous conditions caused many schools to close.
October 21, 2003: Tropical Depression Ursula affects Palawan with light rainfall, killing only one person.
November 1–2, 2003: Tropical Storm Melor (Viring) affects much of Luzon and Eastern Visayas with moderate to heavy rainfall. The storm made landfall over Cagayan, eventually.
November 13–14, 2003: Typhoon Nepartak (Weng) traverses Visayas, with rainfall around the area killing 13 people.
December 27, 2003: Tropical Depression Zigzag made landfall over northeastern Mindanao, bringing light to heavy rainfall there.

2004 
May 17–18, 2004: Typhoon Nida (Dindo) neared the eastern coastline of the Philippines, bringing gusty winds over Eastern Samar, and torrential rainfall throughout most of Luzon and Visayas.

June 7–9, 2004: Typhoon Conson (Frank) affected most of Luzon, with Batanes and the Babuyan Group of Islands placed on Tropical Cyclone Signal No. 3 by PAGASA. Heavy rains killed 30 people in Manila.
June 9–10, 2004: Tropical Storm Chanthu (Gener) crosses Visayas which also brought tremendous amount of rainfall.
June 29–30, 2004: Typhoon Mindulle (Igme) batters the extreme northern portion of Luzon, which led to the deaths of 56 people.
July 14, 2004: Tropical Storm Kompasu (Julian) traverses the Babuyan Group of Islands with light rainfall.
September 15–16, 2004: Tropical Depression Pablo affects Mindanao, Central Visayas and Palawan by bringing light to moderate rainfall.
November 18–20, 2004: Typhoon Muifa (Unding) made landfall over Naga City. Torrential rainfall led to severe flooding in many places, mostly in Southern Luzon and in the Bicol Region.
November 22–23, 2004: Tropical Storm Merbok (Violeta) brought heavy rainfall over much of Luzon. 31 people have been killed by the storm.
November 28–30, 2004: Tropical Depression Winnie worsens flooding over much of Luzon. Catastrophic damages occurred and the storm killed about 1,596 people.
December 2, 2004: Typhoon Nanmadol (Yoyong) batters Luzon with strong winds and heavy rainfall. 70 people died from the typhoon.

2005 
March 17–18, 2005: Tropical Storm Roke (Auring) traverses Eastern Visayas and Central Visayas, bringing minor damages.
May 17, 2005: Tropical Depression Crising meanders off the coast of Surigao del Sur in Mindanao.
July 5, 2005: Tropical Depression Emong brings heavy rainfall over Metro Manila and Central Luzon.
August 12, 2005: Tropical Storm Sanvu (Huaning) made landfall over the northern tip of Cagayan. Rainfall was only experienced over in the northern provinces.
September 20–22, 2005: Tropical Storm Damrey (Labuyo) affects Northern Luzon, Batanes and the Bicol Region with rainfall, which led to severe flooding in many villages.
November 10–11, 2005: Tropical Storm Tembin (Ondoy) impacts most of 8Luzon with heavy rainfall.
November 19–20, 2005: Tropical Storm Bolaven (Pepeng) nears northern Philippines, bringing light to moderate rainfall until it made landfall over Cagayan and dissipated.

2006 
January 25–26, 2006: Tropical Depression Agaton crosses Visayas bringing moderate rainfall.
May 10–12, 2006: Typhoon Chanchu (Caloy) moves through central Philippines. 100 homes were knocked off due to gusty winds in Albay, Bicol, while Metro Manila experienced power outages.

July 12–13, 2006: The outflow of Tropical Storm Bilis (Florita) brought torrential rainfall over Baguio and Manila. 14 people were killed.
July 18, 2006: Similar to the precursor storm, the outflow of Typhoon Kaemi (Glenda) produced rainfall over Luzon.
July 31, 2006: Tropical Storm Prapiroon (Henry) crosses Central Luzon, bringing moderate to heavy rainfall.
August 6, 2006: The outer bands of Tropical Storm Bopha (Inday) produced heavy rains over northern Luzon, triggering flooding that destroyed 1,200 homes and killed seven people.
September 27–28, 2006: Typhoon Xangsane (Milenyo) impacts the Bicol Region, Southern Luzon, Metro Manila and Central Luzon as a strong typhoon. Roughly 200 people died from the typhoon.
October 29–30, 2006: Typhoon Cimaron batters Cagayan as a Category 5 super typhoon. At least 34 people died.
November 10–11, 2006: Typhoon Chebi (Queenie) made landfall in Aurora Probince near Casiguran. Strong winds were experienced over Central Luzon and Ilocos Region.
November 29–30, 2006: Typhoon Durian (Reming) badly impacts the Bicol Region as a Category 4 super typhoon. The typhoon caused massive loss of life when mudflows from the Mayon Volcano buried many villages.
December 9–10, 2006: Typhoon Utor (Seniang) swept through much of Visayas. Only 38 people died from the typhoon.

2007 
August 7, 2007: Typhoon Pabuk (Chedeng) triggered monsoonal rains throughout most of the country. The streets of Manila were flooded by rains which left low-lying areas under neck-deep waters.
August 8–9, 2007: Tropical Storm Wutip (Dodong) triggered numerous landslides and mudslides in Luzon due to the continued rainfall.
August 15–17, 2007: Typhoon Sepat (Egay) and its outflow brings heavy rainfall over Metro Manila.
September 16, 2007: The outer outflow of Typhoon Wipha (Goring) brought heavy rainfall over Negros Occidental.
September 27–29, 2007: Tropical Depression Hanna brought torrential rainfall over Luzon, especially in the Ifugao Province.
November 5, 2007: Typhoon Peipah (Kabayan) makes landfall over Isabela Province and traverses Northern Luzon.
November 19–28, 2007: Typhoon Hagibis (Lando) kills 9 people in the Visayas and Mindanao archipelagos.
November 23–26, 2007: Typhoon Mitag (Mina) brings torrential rainfall and several landslides over Bicol Region and Northern Luzon.

2008 
April 13–14, 2008: Tropical Storm Neoguri (Ambo) makes landfall over Palawan. Heavy rain occurred in the island along with Leyte and Metro Manila.

May 11, 2008: The outer rain bands of Typhoon Rammasun (Butchoy) brought heavy rains and mudslides over Visayas.
May 17–18, 2008: Tropical Storm Halong (Cosme) impacts the Ilocos Region, bringing several power outages due to strong winds. Many areas were heavily flooded, which resulted in the deaths of 58 people.
June 20–23, 2008: Typhoon Fengshen (Frank) traverses Central Visayas, Eastern Visayas and Southern Luzon. The typhoon was known for capsizing the ship MV Princess of the Stars, which killed 814 of the 922 people on board. 557 people were dead in the country excluding the deaths from the capsized ship.
July 4, 2008: Tropical Depression Gener produced  of rainfall over the Ilocos Region.
July 16–17, 2008: Typhoon Kalmaegi (Helen) caused torrential rainfall over much of Luzon, with most impacts were over in the Ilocos Region and Cagayan.
July 27–28, 2008: Typhoon Fung-wong (Igme) and its outer rain bands, along with the southwest monsoon brought heavy rainfall towards the northern part of the country, resulting in several class suspensions and the deaths of seven people.
August 3–6, 2008: Tropical Depression Julian affected Batanes and the Babuyan Group of Islands with Tropical Cyclone Warning Signal No. 1 being raised there.
August 20, 2008: Typhoon Nuri (Karen) makes landfall over the extreme northern tip of Luzon as a Category 3 typhoon.
August 27, 2008: Tropical Depression Lawin affects the eastern seaboards of Luzon bringing light rainfall.
September 9–10, 2008: Typhoon Sinlaku (Marce) affects the northern and northeastern portion of Luzon.
September 21, 2008: Typhoon Hagupit (Nina) passes just north of Luzon, resulting in 16 deaths due to gusty winds.
September 30, 2008: Tropical Storm Higos (Pablo) traverses Eastern Samar, Bicol Region and Southern Luzon.
November 6–8, 2008: Tropical Storm Maysak (Quinta) affects much of the country bringing moderate to heavy rainfall.
November 8, 2008: Tropical Depression Rolly traverses Mindanao and Central Visayas. Rough seas caused a boat to be capsized which killed 11 people.
November 12, 2008: The continuation of Maysak (Quinta), Tropical Depression Siony brings rainfall to the western portion of Luzon. 19 people were killed by Maysak.

2009 

January 3–5, 2009: Tropical Depression Auring caused heavy rain and severe flooding over Eastern Visayas and the eastern portion of Mindanao. The widespread damage led Siargao Island to be under a state of calamity.
February 12–13, 2009: Tropical Depression Bising brought rainfall throughout much of the country, with the worst effects over Visayas.
April 30–May 1, 2009: Tropical Depression Crising and its outer rain bands caused flooding over Southern Luzon with vast damages for crops.
May 2–3, 2009: Tropical Storm Kujira (Dante) causes agricultural damage in most of the Bicol Region.
May 7, 2009: Typhoon Chan-hom (Emong) makes landfall over Pangasinan. Tropical Cyclone Warning Signal No. 3 were raised over much of the Ilocos Region and the western portion of Central Luzon, where gusty winds were recorded.
June 23–24, 2009: Tropical Storm Nangka (Feria) moves through Visayas bringing moderate to heavy rainfall.
July 9, 2009: Tropical Depression Gorio brushes the northern coast of Luzon, bringing rainfall and several landslides.
July 16–17, 2009: Tropical Storm Molave (Isang) moves through the Babuyan Group of Islands.
July 31, 2009: Tropical Depression Jolina affects much of Luzon.
August 5–7, 2009: Typhoon Morakot (Kiko) enhances the southwest monsoon bringing torrential rainfall and landslides, which led to class suspensions in many regions.

September 8, 2009: Tropical Depression Maring prompts the PAGASA to raise a Tropical Cyclone Signal No. 1 over the Ilocos Region, whilst a 48-hour rainfall was recorded over in Metro Manila.
September 12–13, 2009: Tropical Storm Koppu (Nando) brings a 48-hour rainfall over Luzon and a 24-hour rainfall in Visayas and Mindanao.
October 3–8, 2009: Typhoon Parma (Pepeng) meanders over the regions in Northern Luzon. A total of 465 people have died from the typhoon.
October 30, 2009: Typhoon Mirinae (Santi) brings gusty winds with PAGASA issuing a Tropical Cyclone Signal No. 3 over in Metro Manila, Southern Luzon, Mindoro and the Bicol Region.
November 23, 2009: Tropical Depression Urduja brings rainfall over Mindanao, causing many delays in travel.

2010s

2010 
July 13, 2010: Typhoon Conson (Basyang) affected much of Luzon as a weak typhoon, killing 102 people. Due to poor forecasting by PAGASA at the time, President Benigno Aquino III reprimanded the weather agency for failing to predict that the storm would pass over Manila.
July 17, 2010: Tropical Depression Caloy brought rainfall over Luzon which killed eight people.
August 4–5, 2010: Tropical Storm Domeng produced heavy rain which caused several landslides over Northern Luzon. Large swells caused a boat to be capsized which killed three people.
October 17–18, 2010: Typhoon Megi (Juan) makes landfall over Northern Luzon as a Category 5 super typhoon. 31 people were killed by the typhoon.

2011 
May 8–9, 2011: Tropical Storm Aere (Bebeng) made landfall over Catanduanes and brought torrential rainfall over much of the country. 44 people died due to flooding.
May 26, 2011: Typhoon Songda (Chedeng) neared the coastline of the eastern portion of the country where its outer rain bands caused flash flooding and landslides.
June 22–24, 2011: A large outer rain band of Tropical Storm Meari (Falcon) brought tremendous rainfall across the country.
July 26–27, 2011: Tropical Storm Nock-ten (Juaning) brought torrential rainfall over much of the country, especially with Luzon where much of that archipelago was under Tropical Cyclone Signal No. 2. 75 people were killed by the storm.

July 31 – August 2, 2011: Tropical Depression Lando, along with the outflow of Typhoon Muifa (Kabayan) brought torrential rainfall over much of Luzon and killed 8 people.
August 26–27, 2011: Typhoon Nanmadol (Mina) neared Northern Luzon with its peak intensity as a Category 5 super typhoon. The typhoon brought damaging winds which killed 35 people and infrastructural losses of Php40.9 billion (US$907.9 million), making it one of the costliest typhoons in the Philippines.
September 26–27, 2011: Typhoon Nesat (Pedring) brought flash flooding over Central Luzon and Metro Manila. Thousands of residents were out of power and a state of calamity was declared in the aftermath of the typhoon due to the flooding. 85 people were killed while 18 people remained missing.
September 30 – October 1, 2011: Typhoon Nalgae (Quiel) mainly affected Northern Luzon, which made landfall as a Category 4 super typhoon over the Isabela Province. Residents in the archipelago were still recovering from the previous typhoon Nesat when the typhoon hit. 18 people were only killed.
October 11, 2011: Tropical Storm Banyan (Ramon) passed through the southern portion of Visayas and Northern Mindanao, bringing light rainfall. About 75,000 people were affected by the storm.
December 16–17, 2011: Tropical Storm Washi (Sendong) passed through the archipelago of Mindanao, killing 2,546 people in total, making it one of the deadliest storms to affect the Philippines.

2012 
June 1–2, 2012: Tropical Storm Mawar (Ambo) brought torrential rainfall over the Bicol Region, triggering delays in air flights.
June 16–17, 2012: The outer rain bands of Typhoon Guchol (Butchoy) brought rainfall across much of the country. Only one person drowned in Rizal Province.
July 19–20, 2012: Tropical Depression Ferdie caused widespread rainfall and gusty winds in Luzon and Visayas.
July 28–31, 2012: Typhoon Saola (Gener) and its outer rain bands helped enhance the southwest monsoon which brought torrential rainfall and widespread flooding over much of the country. 54 people died while damage from the storm amounted to ₱728 million (US$17.3 million), more than half of them was due to agricultural losses.
August 15, 2012: Tropical Storm Kai-tak (Helen) brushed the northern coastline of Northern Luzon as a weak tropical storm, bringing flash flooding and several landslides.
August 23–27, 2012: Typhoon Tembin (Igme) mostly affected the islands of extreme Northern Luzon. Flash flooding was also reported in Luzon which killed 8 people.
September 25–26, 2012: Typhoon Jelawat (Lawin) brought large swells and light rainfall over the eastern seaboards of the country.
October 3, 2012: Tropical Storm Gaemi (Marce) and its outer bands drops heavy rainfall over Luzon, prompting class suspensions.
October 23–24, 2012: Tropical Storm Son-Tinh (Ofel) passes by the central part of the country, with Tropical Cyclone Signal No. 2 being raised in much of Visayas.
December 3–4, 2012: Typhoon Bopha (Pablo) becomes the strongest tropical cyclone on record to affect Mindanao. Extensive and widespread damage was reported in that archipelago and left a total of 1,901 people dead.
December 26, 2012: Tropical Storm Wukong (Quinta) passes through Visayas bringing light rainfall.

2013 

January 2–3, 2013: Tropical Depression Auring passes Mindanao and Palawan, bringing light rainfall.
January 10–12, 2013: Tropical Depression Bising stays off the eastern coast while bringing moderate to heavy rainfall over Eastern Visayas, Bicol Region and Mindanao.
February 19–20, 2013: Tropical Depression Crising affects the southern portion of the country bringing heavy rainfall and flooding.
June 8–10, 2013: Tropical Storm Yagi (Dante) and its southwestern outflow bring heavy rainfall to the country, prompting the PAGASA to declare the 2013 Philippine rainy season on June 10.
June 16–18, 2013: Tropical Storm Leepi (Emong) worsens the flooding in the country from the precursor storm.

June 19, 2013: Tropical Depression Fabian briefly affects the western coast of the country with moderate rainfall.
June 28–29, 2013: Tropical Storm Rumbia (Gorio) impacts Southern Luzon and Eastern Visayas.
July 17, 2013: Tropical Storm Cimaron (Isang) brushes the northeastern tip of Luzon. A lightning incident killed two people in Ilocos Sur.
August 11–12, 2013: Typhoon Utor (Labuyo) batters Luzon as a strong typhoon. Damage losses from the typhoon amounted to ₱1.58 billion (US$36.4 million), the majority resulting from agricultural damage.
August 16–19, 2013: Tropical Storm Trami (Maring) enhances the southwestern monsoon which brought torrential rainfall and extreme flooding over Metro Manila, and much of the northern part of the country. 
September 20, 2013: Typhoon Usagi (Odette) brushes Batanes as a Category 4 super typhoon.
October 10–11, 2013: Typhoon Nari (Santi) strikes and batters Luzon from a Category 3 typhoon. Gusty winds caused damages of up to Php3.3 billion (US$77 million).
October 31, 2013: Typhoon Krosa (Vinta) makes landfall over the northwestern tip of Cagayan.
November 4, 2013: Tropical Depression Wilma affects southern Philippines.
November 8, 2013: Typhoon Haiyan (Yolanda) brushes Visayas as an intense typhoon, killing 6,352 people. It was also the costliest typhoon in the Philippines.
November 11, 2013: Tropical Depression Zoraida affects Palawan and Mindanao.

2014 
January 15–17, 2014: Tropical Storm Lingling (Agaton) produces heavy rainfall over Mindanao, with damages toppling to Php567 million (US$12.6 million).
January 31, 2014: Tropical Storm Kajiki (Basyang) brings a few landslides over Cebu and Southern Leyte.
March 21–22, 2014: Tropical Depression Caloy affects Eastern Visayas and Northern Mindanao.
June 10, 2014: Tropical Storm Mitag (Ester) and its outflow helps bring in rainfall to much of the country, also prompting the PAGASA to declare the 2014 wet season to June 10.
July 15–16, 2014: Typhoon Rammasun (Glenda) impacts the Bicol Region as a Category 4 typhoon. In total, Rammasun killed 106 people and caused a damage up to Php38.6 billion (US$885 million).
September 15, 2014: Typhoon Kalmaegi (Luis) batters Northern Luzon.
September 19–20, 2014: Tropical Storm Fung-wong (Mario) brings severe rainfall and flash flooding over Southern Luzon, especially in Metro Manila.
November 27, 2014: Tropical Depression Queenie passes through southern Visayas and Northern Mindanao.
December 6–8, 2014: Typhoon Hagupit (Ruby) impacts much of the Visayas archipelago and Bicol Region.
December 28–30, 2014: Tropical Storm Jangmi (Seniang) affects much of Mindanao bringing heavy rainfall.

2015 
January 17–18, 2015: Tropical Storm Mekkhala (Amang) affects Eastern Visayas and the Bicol Region. Notably, the storm disturbed Pope Francis’ visit to the country after the victims of Typhoon Haiyan on November 8, 2013. Although the storm also caused an airplane crash in Tacloban, nobody was hurt in the incident.

April 5, 2015: A weakening Tropical Storm Maysak (Chedeng) hits Cagayan Valley, killing only 5 people.
May 8–10, 2015: Typhoon Noul (Dodong) hits the northwestern tip of Luzon as a Category 5 super typhoon.
July 4–6, 2015: Tropical Storm Linfa (Egay) affects Northern Luzon. 198 houses were damaged and power outages were experienced within the affected area.
August 19–21, 2015: Typhoon Goni (Ineng) batters the northern portion of Luzon as a strong typhoon.
September 30 – October 1, 2015: Tropical Storm Mujigae (Kabayan) brings light rainfall over much of Luzon.
October 17–19, 2015: Typhoon Koppu (Lando) impacts Northern Luzon as a Category 4 super typhoon, killing 62 people in total.
December 14–15, 2015: Typhoon Melor (Nona) passes through northern Visayas and Southern Luzon as a strong typhoon.
December 18, 2015: Tropical Depression Onyok makes landfall over Davao Oriental, bringing minor damages.

2016 
June 26, 2016: Tropical Depression Ambo brings some rainfall over Luzon.
July 31, 2016: Tropical Storm Nida (Carina) makes landfall over Cagayan. Landslides made major roads in the regions impassible.
September 13, 2016: Typhoon Meranti (Ferdie) strikes the province of Batanes as a Category 5 super typhoon and passes by Itbayat. A state of calamity was declared in the province a few days later.
October 14–15, 2016: Typhoon Sarika (Karen) impacts Central Luzon as a Category 4 typhoon.
October 19, 2016: Typhoon Haima (Lawin) impacts Northern Luzon from a Category 5 super typhoon. Signal No. 5 was raised in the passage of the typhoon.
November 24–25, 2016: Tropical Storm Tokage (2016) passes by Visayas, bringing heavy rainfall and flooding.
December 25, 2016: Typhoon Nock-ten (Nina) impacts the Bicol Region and Southern Luzon.

2017 
January 8–10, 2017: Tropical Depression Auring makes landfall over Northern Mindanao. Flooding from Auring killed a total of 11 people. and damages were totalled at ₱7.14 million (US$144,000) from agriculture and fishing in Negros Occidental.
April 15, 2017: Tropical Depression Crising passes Visayas bringing some rainfall. Ten people were killed by the storm in Cebu.

July 28–29, 2017: Typhoon Nesat (Gorio) enhanced the southwestern monsoon which brought widespread rainfall and flooding throughout much of the country. Damages reportedly reached ₱247.58 million (US$4.9 million).
August 25, 2017: Tropical Storm Pakhar (Jolina) affects Northern Luzon. The Cordillera Administrative Region experiences power outages and several landslides.
September 11–12, 2017: Tropical Storm Doksuri (Maring) passes Central Luzon and Metro Manila. The storm left 22 people dead and four missing.
October 12, 2017: Tropical Storm Khanun (Odette) develops to the coast of Ilocos Region, killing only one person.
October 31, 2017: Tropical Storm Damrey (Ramil) brings torrential rainfall over Western Visayas.
November 9–10, 2017: Tropical Storm Haikui (Salome) traverses Southern Luzon and Bicol Region with landslides being reported over the provinces.
December 15–17, 2017: Tropical Storm Kai-tak (Urduja) makes a few landslides over Visayas, bringing torrential rainfall and flash flooding, killing 83 people.
December 21–22, 2017: Typhoon Tembin (Vinta) passes over Mindanao and Palawan. 266 people died from the storm.

2018 
January 1–2, 2018: Tropical Storm Bolaven (Agaton) impacts southern Philippines and the island of Palawan. Rainfall caused several travel delays in many provinces. Total damage was recorded at ₱554.7 million (US$11.1 million), mostly coming from crop damage.
February 13, 2018: Tropical Storm Sanba (Basyang) affects Mindanao with heavy rainfall. A state of calamity was declared in two municipalities in Surigao del Sur.
June 8, 2018: Tropical Storm Maliksi (Domeng) brought rainfall which prompted the PAGASA to declare the official start of the rainy season on June 8. Two people were killed by heavy monsoonal rains, enhanced by Maliksi, in the Philippines.
June 13, 2018: Tropical Storm Gaemi (Ester) briefly impacts the extreme northern islands of the country. 3 people died by monsoonal rains.
July 21, 2018: Tropical Depression Josie brings torrential rainfall and ocean-high flooding throughout most of the country, especially Metro Manila. Damages toppled up to ₱4.66 billion (US$87.4 million). 
September 10, 2018: Tropical Storm Barijat (Neneng) caused some landslides over Batanes.
September 14–15, 2018: Typhoon Mangkhut (Ompong) batters most of Luzon. Tropical Cyclone Signal No. 4 was raised over the northern provinces. 127 people died due to gusty winds and rainfall that caused landslides.
October 29–30, 2018: A weakening Typhoon Yutu (Rosita) makes landfall over Northern Luzon as a strong typhoon. Landslides and flooding killed 27 people.
November 20, 2018: Tropical Depression Samuel passes through Visayas.
December 29, 2018: Tropical Depression Usman affects Mindanao and Eastern Visayas with torrential rainfall and heavy flooding. The weak system killed 156 people dead, with 26 people missing.

2019 
January 20–21, 2019: Tropical Depression Amang made landfall over Siargao province. The storm brought landslides over Davao Oriental and Agusan del Norte.
March 19, 2019: Tropical Depression Chedeng made landfall over Davao Occidental. Some minor infrastructural damage were reported.
July 17, 2019: Tropical Storm Danas (Falcon) affects the top half of the country with rainfall.

August 5–7, 2019: Typhoon Lekima (Hanna), despite it did not made landfall, passes close to Batanes with Tropical Cyclone Signal No. 1 being raised there. Rainfall and flooding caused several class suspensions. Agricultural damages were recorded over Central Luzon.
August 24, 2019: Tropical Storm Bailu (Ineng) dropped rainfall over Northern Luzon. Flooding in Ilocos Norte prompted local officials to declare a state of calamity.
August 27, 2019: Tropical Depression Jenny passes over Central Luzon, leaving 2 people dead and moderate damages.
September 3–4, 2019: Typhoon Lingling (Liwayway) enhances the southwest monsoon which brought heavy rainfall throughout most of the country.
September 30, 2019: Typhoon Mitag (Onyok) nears the country without making landfall, but produces moderate to heavy shows over Cagayan and Batanes.
November 8, 2019: Tropical Storm Nakri (Quiel), combined with the effects of a cold front, produced widespread rainfall. Cagayan Province alone suffered ₱1.8 billion (US$35.6 million) in damage.
November 19–20, 2019: Typhoon Kalmaegi (Ramon) hits Cagayan and moved southwestward over the Luzon archipelago.
December 2–3, 2019: Typhoon Kammuri (Tisoy) passes through Visayas and the Bicol Region as a Category 4 typhoon. Heavy winds and flooding were reported throughout most of the country.
December 24–25, 2019: Typhoon Phanfone (Ursula) passes through the Visayas archipelago as a Category 3 typhoon.

2020s

2020 
May 14–17, 2020: Typhoon Vongfong (Ambo) made landfall over Eastern Samar as a Category 3 typhoon, and affected much of Luzon. Preparations for the typhoon were complicated due to the ongoing COVID-19 pandemic. Throughout the Philippines, Vongfong caused around ₱1.57 billion (US$31.1 million) in damage, and killed five people.
June 11–12, 2020: Tropical Depression Butchoy prompted the PAGASA to issue Tropical Cyclone Signal No. 1 over the western portion of the country as it brought heavy rainfall. The storm's rainfall also prompted PAGASA to declare the start of the 2020 Philippine rainy season on June 12.

July 13–14, 2020: Tropical Depression Carina brought heavy rainfall which led to Tropical Cyclone Signal No. 1 being raised over the Babuyan Islands and Batanes.
August 10, 2020: Tropical Storm Mekkhala (Ferdie) brought monsoonal conditions over much of Luzon.
October 13–14, 2020: Tropical Depression Ofel passed through Southern Luzon and the northern portion of Visayas. Floods and rainfall brought damages of up to ₱9.1 million (US$187,000).
October 20, 2020: Tropical Storm Saudel (Pepito) affected much of Luzon, which made landfall over Casiguran, Aurora. There were no deaths reported but damages were up to ₱105.8 million (US$2.18 million).
October 25–26, 2020: Typhoon Molave (Quinta) made three landfalls, affecting the Bicol Region, Southern Luzon and the island of Mindoro. The typhoon left 27 people dead and damages of ₱4.22 billion (US$87.1 million).
October 31 – November 1, 2020: Typhoon Goni (Rolly) made landfall over Catanduanes as a Category 5 super typhoon; one of the strongest landfalling tropical cyclone on record by 1-minute sustained winds. Damages were up to ₱20 billion (US$369 million), making it the seventh costliest typhoon in the country.
November 5–6, 2020: Tropical Storm Atsani (Siony) affected Batanes and the Babuyan Islands.
November 11, 2020: Typhoon Vamco (Ulysses) caused the worst flooding in Metro Manila since 2009. 98 people were killed and damages of ₱20.3 billion (US$421 million), the sixth costliest Philippine typhoon on record.
December 18–19, 2020: Tropical Depression Vicky caused flooding and several landslides over southern Philippines. Only nine people were killed.

2021 

January 19–20, 2021: an unnamed tropical depression affected much of Visayas and Northern Mindanao. Heavy rainfall from the system resulted in one death and agricultural damages of up to ₱642.5 million (US$13.2 million).
February 20–22, 2021: Tropical Storm Dujuan (Auring) affected Eastern Visayas and the Caraga region with heavy rainfall and flooding.
April 17–19, 2021: Typhoon Surigae (Bising) brushes the eastern part of the Philippines, killing only 10 people.
May 13, 2021: Tropical Storm Crising made landfall over Mindanao as a weak system, bringing damages estimated at ₱23.2 million (US$486,000).
June 1–2, 2021: Tropical Storm Choi-wan (Dante) traversed much of Visayas and northern Mindanao, bringing torrential rainfall and flooding.
September 6–8, 2021: Tropical Storm Conson (Jolina) moved over much of Visayas and Southern Luzon. The storm caused extensive flooding which caused damages of about ₱1.59 billion (US$31.8 million).
September 10–11, 2021: Typhoon Chanthu (Kiko) brushes the northeastern coastline of Luzon bringing gusty winds, while moving directly through Batanes and causing ₱1.49 billion in damage (US$30 million).
October 10–11, 2021: Tropical Storm Kompasu (Maring) brought widespread flooding over much of the country, with severe impacts over the Luzon archipelago. The storm killed 43 people and caused damages estimated at ₱6.4 billion (US$127 million).
December 16–17, 2021: Typhoon Rai (Odette) strikes the Caraga Region and causes catastrophic damage before continuing across southern Visayas and moving through Palawan. The typhoon killed 410 people and left more than ₱51.8 billion (US$1.02 billion) in damage.

2022 
April 9–11, 2022: Tropical Storm Megi (Agaton) meandered through the Visayan islands of Samar, Leyte, Cebu and Bohol, causing widespread flooding and landslides. The storm caused 214 fatalities and damages amounting to ₱4.72 billion (US$90.8 million).
September 24–26, 2022: Typhoon Noru (Karding) meandered through the Luzon provinces Laguna, Rizal, Quezon, Cavite, Batangas, Metro Manila, Zambales, Bulacan, Pampanga, Pangasinan, Tarlac, Nueva Ecija, Nueva Vizcaya Bataan and Aurora, causing widespread flooding and landslides.
October 28–30, 2022: Severe Tropical Storm Nalgae (Paeng) drops intense to torrential rain across Luzon and Visayas, killing 160 people.

Climatology

Deadly storms 
The following list are the fourteen most deadly storms that impacted the Philippines from 2000. As shown, all storms in this list have killed over 100 people. Only six storms have exceeded the death toll of 1,000. Total number of deaths recorded are only from the country itself.

See also 

Typhoon
Typhoons in the Philippines

List of typhoons in the Philippines (1963–1999)
 Pacific typhoon season

References 

+
Lists of events in the Philippines
Philippines